Barbara Novak Marshall (March 5, 1944 – February 22, 2009) was an American television broadcast journalist and politician. She was elected three times to the Honolulu City Council in Honolulu, Hawaii following her retirement from broadcasting.

Marshall was known throughout Hawaii for a long career as an investigative journalist, consumer advocate, documentary filmmaker, news anchor and reporter for KHON-TV television station.

Biography
Born Barbara Novak in Berwyn, Illinois she went on to become the first female graduate of the Radio and Television Journalism program at the University of Illinois in 1965. As Barbara Novak, she  broke through television journalism's glass ceiling to become the first woman Radio-TV grad to anchor a regularly scheduled  broadcast television news program in the United States.  She rose to further prominence as Barbara Marshall in Boston, where she worked for a decade as an award-winning reporter for two Boston television stations, first for channel 56 WLVI and then for channel 4  WBZ-TV. A number of her interviews and stories were broadcast on NBC-TV network newscasts.

Marshall transported her career to Honolulu in 1979, working for 23 years as reporter, news anchor and producer for channel 2 KHON. During her tenure at KHON, Marshall initiated Action Line (a TV-consumer complaint line), live television election coverage and created the first morning news program in Hawaii. She won awards for two documentaries: One on the eruption of the Kilauea volcano, and another on the life of Challenger astronaut Ellison Onizuka. 

In 2002, she won a seat on the Honolulu City Council in her first attempt at elective office. She was reelected to the council seat on September 18, 2004 and again on September 25, 2008 and was elected chairman by her peers on January 2, 2007.

Personal
Marshall died on February 22, 2009, aged 64,  after an eight-month battle with colon cancer. Marshall's husband, Cliff Ziems, endorsed her aide, Ikaika Anderson, to fill her city council seat; he was elected in a special election and was sworn into office on May 27, 2009.

References

External links
 Honolulu Council - Barbara Marshall
Remembering Former KHON2 Reporter Barbara Marshall KHON2 news story with video.

1944 births
2009 deaths
American television journalists
Deaths from cancer in Hawaii
Deaths from colorectal cancer
Honolulu City Council members
University of Illinois Urbana-Champaign College of Media alumni
Women in Hawaii politics
People from Berwyn, Illinois
Politicians from Cook County, Illinois
20th-century American politicians
Women city councillors in Hawaii
Journalists from Illinois
20th-century American women politicians
American women television journalists
20th-century American journalists
21st-century American women